Eupithecia palpata, the small pine looper, is a moth of the family Geometridae. The species was first described by Alpheus Spring Packard in 1873. It is found in Canada (Newfoundland, Nova Scotia, Prince Edward Island, New Brunswick, Quebec, Ontario, Manitoba, Saskatchewan, Alberta and British Columbia) and the north-eastern parts of the United States. The habitat consists of spruce woods.

The wingspan is about 23 mm.

The larvae feed on balsam fir, eastern hemlock, eastern larch, pines, spruces and possibly other conifers.

References

External links

"Small Pine Looper (Eupithecia palpata)". BugwoodWiki.

Moths described in 1873
palpata
Taxa named by Alpheus Spring Packard
Moths of North America